Culcharry  is a small residential settlement, close to the village of Cawdor and the hamlet of Brackla, lying 4 miles southwest of Nairn,  in Nairnshire, Scottish Highlands and is in the Scottish council area of Highland.

References

Populated places in the County of Nairn